"Come Saturday Morning" is a popular song with music by Fred Karlin and lyrics by Dory Previn, published in 1969.

Background
It was first performed by The Sandpipers on the soundtrack of the 1969 film The Sterile Cuckoo starring Liza Minnelli.  The Sandpipers also included the song on their 1970 album, Come Saturday Morning.  In 1970, "Come Saturday Morning" was nominated for the Academy Award for Best Original Song, losing to "Raindrops Keep Fallin' on My Head" from the film Butch Cassidy and the Sundance Kid.

Chart performance
The Sandpipers' recording, issued with "Pretty Flamingo" as the B-side, debuted on the Billboard Hot 100 in December 1969, remaining in the chart for eight weeks and peaking at #83 in January 1970 and also lasting 13 weeks on the Easy Listening chart and peaking at #9. The single, reissued with "To Put Up with You" as the B-side, re-entered both charts in April 1970, when it spent an additional 12 weeks on the Hot 100, peaking at #17 in June, and an additional 11 weeks on the Easy Listening chart, peaking at #5. The song also peaked at number 78 in Australia, becoming the group's only charting release in that territory.

Other recordings include
Liza Minnelli in 1969 on her album Come Saturday Morning.
Chet Baker on his 1970 album Blood, Chet and Tears
Johnny Mathis on his 1970 album Close To You
Tony Bennett on his 1970 album Tony Bennett's Something
Patti Page on her 1970 album Honey Come Back
Mark Lindsay on his 1970 album Silverbird
Scott Walker on his 1972 album The Moviegoer
Billy Vaughn on his 1970 album Winter World Of Love
Woody Herman on his 1974 album Thundering Herd
Rumer on her 2010 CD single Aretha

In popular culture
The song is heard in the episode "Diggs (The Simpsons)" as a guest character, Diggs (voiced by Daniel Radcliffe), a falconer, is having fun with Bart and the falcon.

References

1969 songs
1969 singles
1970 singles
A&M Records singles
The Sandpipers songs
Scott Walker (singer) songs
Songs written for films
Songs with music by Fred Karlin
Songs with lyrics by Dory Previn